Supa Dam is built across Kalinadi (Kannada) or Kali river in state of Karnataka in India and is the highest dam in Karnataka. The dam is situated at GaneshaGudi, which is in Joida taluk of Uttara Kannada district. The dam forms the main storage reservoir to all the power houses in Kalinadi hydro power project of total installed capacity of 1180MW, which includes main Nagzari power house of 810 MW capacity. The power house at the foot of the dam has two 50 MW electricity generators. The electricity generated is supplied to different parts of Karnataka. The dam was built by Hindustan Steel Works Construction Limited and is designed, owned and operated by Karnataka Power Corporation Limited. The power house was commissioned in 1985.

See also 

 List of dams and reservoirs in India.

External links 

Supa Dam

Dams in Karnataka
Hydroelectric power stations in Karnataka
Buildings and structures in Uttara Kannada district
Tourist attractions in Uttara Kannada district
Dams in Western Ghats
Dams completed in 1987
1985 establishments in Karnataka
20th-century architecture in India